Post Society is an EP by Canadian heavy metal band Voivod released on February 26, 2016. It is the band's seventeenth release overall and the first studio release with Dominique Laroche on bass, replacing Jean-Yves Thériault.

Reception

The album received highly positive reviews. Writing for Blabbermouth.net, Ray Van Horn Jr. suggested that Post Society fell between Dimension Hatröss and Angel Rat with its mixture of thrash metal and progressive metal. Jedd Beaudoin, writing for PopMatters, praised Voivod for being "so vital, focused, committed."

Track listing

Personnel
Voivod
 Denis Bélanger (Snake) – vocals
 Daniel Mongrain (Chewy) – guitar
 Dominique Laroche (Rocky) – bass
 Michel Langevin (Away) – drums, artwork

Production
Francis Perron - mixing
Pierre Rémillard - mastering

References

Voivod (band) albums
2016 EPs
Century Media Records EPs